Philip Carr (25 September 1953 – 30 March 2020) was a British linguist and Emeritus Professor in the English Department of the University of Montpellier. He is best known for his works on  phonology and philosophy of linguistics.
His book Phonology is a coursebook taught across the world in phonology courses.
He was the father of three children and enjoyed raising his son and daughter in the sunny South of France.

Books
 Phonology, Palgrave Macmillan 1993 (1st ed), 2013 (2nd ed)
 A Glossary of Phonology, Edinburgh University Press 2008
 Linguistic realities: an autonomist metatheory for the generative enterprise, Cambridge University Press 1990
 English Phonetics and Phonology: An Introduction, 2nd edition 2013
 Headhood, Elements, Specification and Contrastivity: Phonological papers in honour of John Anderson (ed.)
 Phonological Knowledge: Conceptual and Empirical Issues, with Noel Burton-Roberts and Gerard Docherty (eds.), Oxford University Press 2000

References

1953 births
2020 deaths
Linguists from the United Kingdom
British phonologists
Academic staff of the University of Montpellier
Philosophers of linguistics
Academics of Newcastle University
Academic staff of the University of Khartoum